Ali II may refer to: 

 Ali ibn Umar (ruled 874–883), Sultan of Morocco
 Ali II Lashkari (ruled 1034–1049), Shaddadid emir
 Ali II (Bavandid ruler) (ruled 1271)
 Ali II of Bornu, 17th century ruler of the Bornu Empire
 Ali II ibn Hussein (1712–1782), Bey of Tunis
 Ali II of Yejju (–), Ethiopian noble
 Dündar Ali Osman Osmanoğlu (1930–2021), titular Sultan of Turkey and Ottoman Caliph from 2017 to his death under the name Ali II